Petar Ivanov (29 June 1903 – 18 January 1968) was a Bulgarian footballer. He competed in the men's tournament at the 1924 Summer Olympics.

References

1903 births
1968 deaths
Bulgarian footballers
Bulgaria international footballers
Olympic footballers of Bulgaria
Footballers at the 1924 Summer Olympics
People from Yambol
Association football goalkeepers
PFC Levski Sofia players